

342001–342100 

|-id=017
| 342017 Ramonin ||  || Ramon Lacruz Alcaraz (born 1988) is an aeronautical engineer at Universidad Politecnica de Madrid. || 
|}

342101–342200 

|-bgcolor=#f2f2f2
| colspan=4 align=center | 
|}

342201–342300 

|-bgcolor=#f2f2f2
| colspan=4 align=center | 
|}

342301–342400 

|-bgcolor=#f2f2f2
| colspan=4 align=center | 
|}

342401–342500 

|-id=431
| 342431 Hilo ||  || Hilo, the largest city on Big island of Hawaii, United States || 
|}

342501–342600 

|-bgcolor=#f2f2f2
| colspan=4 align=center | 
|}

342601–342700 

|-id=620
| 342620 Beita ||  || Beatriz Lacruz Alcaraz (born 1990), a computer sciences engineer at the Universidad Politecnica de Madrid. || 
|}

342701–342800 

|-id=764
| 342764 Alantitus ||  || Alan Titus (born 1964) is an American paleontologist specializing in ammonites. He has also been instrumental in finding and describing new species of dinosaurs from the Late Cretaceous subcontinent of Laramidia. || 
|}

342801–342900 

|-id=843
| 342843 Davidbowie ||  || David Bowie (David Robert Jones, 1947–2016), a British musician, singer, producer and actor. || 
|}

342901–343000 

|-id=000
| 343000 Ijontichy ||  || Ijon Tichy: Space Pilot, a satirical German science fiction TV-series. The space traveller Ijon Tichý navigates the universe in his ""three-room rocket". The story is based on The Star Diaries by Stanisław Lem. || 
|}

References 

342001-343000